Dawson is a small unincorporated community located in DeKalb County, Alabama, United States.

Geography

References

Unincorporated communities in DeKalb County, Alabama
Unincorporated communities in Alabama